The List of Lockheed F-104 Starfighter operators lists the countries and their air force units that operated the Lockheed F-104 Starfighter.

Military operators

Belgium
Belgium operated F-104G and TF-104Gs. They served with four squadrons: 23 and 31 (fighter-bombers), 349 and 350 (interceptors), and finally an OCU unit. In total 101 SABCA-built F-104Gs and 12 TF-104G built by Lockheed were purchased (one F-104G crashed before delivery). The Belgian Air Force operated the type from 14 February 1963 to 19 September 1983; some survivors were sent to Taiwan (23 aircraft) and Turkey (18 aircraft). Thirty-eight F-104G and three TF-104Gs were lost in accidents.
Belgian Air Force
1 Wing, BAF based at Beauvechain
349th Squadron
350th Squadron
10 Wing, BAF based at Kleine Brogel
23rd Squadron
31st Squadron

Canada

The RCAF, and later the unified Canadian Forces, operated 200 Canadian-built CF-104s and 38 dual-control trainer CF-104Ds (built by Lockheed) between 1962 and 1986. CF-104s were equipped with additional electronic equipment, with a Radar warning receiver function, in the tail and under the nose. Losses were high, with around 110 crashes in Europe. Its heavy usage, mainly at low-level for bombing and reconnaissance missions was a major factor, while bad weather conditions contributed to almost 50% of the accidental losses. The airframes had an average of 6,000 flying hours when phased-out; triple that of Germany's F-104s. Surplus CF-104s and CF-104Ds were later transferred to Denmark, Norway, and Turkey.
Royal Canadian Air Force
1 Wing RCAF based at Marville / Lahr, W.Germany
No. 439 (Sabre-Toothed Tiger) Squadron
No. 441 (Silver Fox) Squadron
2 Wing RCAF based at Grostenquin / Baden-Söllingen / Lahr
No. 421 (Red Indian) Squadron
No. 430 (Silver Falcon) Squadron
3 Wing RCAF based at Grostenquin / Baden-Söllingen / Zweibrücken
No. 427 (Lion) Squadron
No. 434 (Bluenose) Squadron
4 Wing RCAF based at Baden-Söllingen
No. 422 (Tomahawk) Squadron
No. 444 (Cobra) Squadron
Central Experimental and Proving Establishment/Aerospace Engineering and Test Establishment
6 Strike-Recce OTU
No. 417 Operational Training Squadron RCAF

Denmark

Denmark initially received 25 F-104G and four TF-104Gs under the Mutual Defense Assistance Act during 1964–65. Surplus Canadian license-built aircraft were transferred between 1971–73 (15 CF-104 and 7 CF-104D). A total of 51 Starfighters were operated by Denmark before their retirement in 1986. Fifteen surplus F-104Gs and three TF-104Gs were transferred to Taiwan in 1987.
Royal Danish Air Force used the F-104s as interceptors.
Eskadrille 723 based at Aalborg Air Base
Converted from F-86D Sabre in 1965 and switched to F-16A/B in 1984.
Eskadrille 726 based at Aalborg Air Base
Converted from F-86D Sabre in 1964 and switched to F-16A/B in 1986.

West Germany

West Germany received 916 F-104s, comprising 749 F/RF-104Gs, 137 TF-104Gs and 30 F-104Fs, forming the major combat equipment of both the Luftwaffe and Marineflieger. At its peak in the mid-1970s, the Luftwaffe operated five F-104 -equipped fighter bomber wings, two interceptor wings and two tactical reconnaissance wings. The Marineflieger operated a further two wings of F-104s in the maritime strike and reconnaissance roles.

The Starfighter entered service with the Luftwaffe in July 1960, with deliveries continuing until March 1973, remaining in operational service until 16 October 1987, and continuing in use for test purposes until 22 May 1991.

The two squadrons operating the RF-104G were re-equipped with RF-4E Phantoms in the early 1970s.

The Marineflieger initially used AS.30 command guidance missiles as anti-ship weapons, but these were replaced with the more sophisticated and longer-ranged radar-guided AS.34 Kormoran missile, allowing stand-off attacks to be carried out against enemy ships. West German Starfighters proved to have an alarming accident rate, 292 of 916 Starfighters crashed, claiming the lives of 115 pilots.

Luftwaffe
Aufklärungsgeschwader 51 "Immelmann" based at Ingolstadt / Manching and previously Bremgarten.
Aufklärungsgeschwader 52 based at Leck, Nordfriesland
Jagdbombergeschwader 31 "Boelcke" based at Nörvenich
Jagdbombergeschwader 32 based at Lechfeld
Jagdbombergeschwader 33 based at Büchel
Jagdbombergeschwader 34 based at Memmingen
Jagdbombergeschwader 36 based at Rheine-Hopsten
Jagdgeschwader 71 "Richthofen" based at Wittmundhafen
Jagdgeschwader 74 based at Neuburg

Marineflieger
Marinefliegergeschwader 1 based at Schleswig-Jagel
Marinefliegergeschwader 2 based at Eggebek

Greece

Greece received 45 new-built F-104G and six TF-104s under the Military Assistance Program. These were supplemented by second-hand Starfighters passed on from other NATO air forces, including 79 from Germany, seven from the Netherlands and nine from Spain. The Starfighter entered Greek service in April 1964, equipping two wings, leaving service in March 1993.
Greek Air Force
335 Moira "Tigris" based at Tanagra / Araxos
336 Moira "Olympos" based at Tanagra / Araxos

Italy

In the Italian Air Force, the F-104 was a mainstay from the early 1960s until the end of the 20th century. The first flight for an Italian F-104G was a Lockheed-built aircraft, MM6501, on 9 June 1962; however, the first Fiat/Aeritalia-built example flew two years later on 5 October 1962. Italy initially received a total of 105 F-104G, 24 TF-104G and 20 RF-104Gs, becoming operational in March 1963. This fleet was later increased by the addition of 205 built under license by Aeritalia F-104S aircraft and six ex-Luftwaffe TF-104Gs bringing the total number of aircraft operated to 360. In 1986 the AMI was the largest operator with eleven units flying the Starfighter operationally. Up to 1997, Italy lost 137 (38%) of its F-104s in 928,000 flying hours (14.7 aircraft every 100,000 hrs). The F-104 was officially retired from AMI service during a large ceremony at Pratica di Mare in 2004.
Aeronautica Militare Italiana
3° Stormo based at Villafranca
28° Gruppo
132° Gruppo
4° Stormo based at Grosseto
9° Gruppo
20° Gruppo
5° Stormo based at Rimini
23° Gruppo
102° Gruppo
6° Stormo based at Ghedi
154° Gruppo
36° Stormo based at Gioia del Colle
12° Gruppo
156° Gruppo
37° Stormo based at Grazzanise
10° Gruppo
51° Stormo based at Treviso / Istrana
22° Gruppo
155° Gruppo
53° Stormo based at Cameri / Novara
21° Gruppo

Japan

The JASDF operated 210 F-104J air-superiority fighters and 20 dual-control trainer F-104DJs. Called Eiko ("Glory"), they served from October 1962 to 1986, losing only 3 airplanes in this time including a mid-air collision accident. Seven air-superiority squadrons used them: 201, 202, 203, 204, 205, 206, 207. Japanese F-104s faced intrusive Soviet airplanes during this long service. Twenty two of the Japanese F-104s were eventually converted to drones for aerial target practice. 31 F-104J and five F-104DJ aircraft were sold to Taiwan.
Japan Air Self-Defense Force
2nd Kokudan based at Chitose Air Base (201st) and Komatsu Air Base (203rd)
201st Tactical Fighter Squadron
203rd Tactical Fighter Squadron
5th Kokudan based at Nyutabaru Air Base (202nd) and Tsuiki Air Base (204th)
202nd Tactical Fighter Squadron
204th Tactical Fighter Squadron
6th Kokudan based at Komatsu Air Base
205th Tactical Fighter Squadron
7th Air Wing based at Hyakuri Air Base, part at Naha Air Base
206th Tactical Fighter Squadron
207th Tactical Fighter Squadron

Jordan

Jordan received 29 F-104A and four F-104B aircraft delivered under the Military Assistance Program in 1967. Controlled by the United States these aircraft were moved temporarily to Turkey during the Arab–Israeli Six-Day War. Replaced by the Northrop F-5 and Dassault Mirage F1 by 1983, the survivors serve as airfield decoys.
Royal Jordanian Air Force
No. 9 Squadron RJAF based at Prince Hassan Air Base, ceased flying F-104 in 1977.
No. 25 Squadron RJAF based at Mwaffaq Salti

Netherlands

The Netherlands operated European-built F-104s with the exception of the TF-104G. These were delivered directly from Palmdale to the KLu. A total of 138 Starfighters were delivered to the Koninklijke Luchtmacht (Royal Netherlands Air Force, or KLu). Many Dutch aircraft were transferred to Turkey.
Royal Netherlands Air Force
306 Squadron RNLAF
311 Squadron RNLAF
312 Squadron RNLAF
322 Squadron RNLAF
323 Squadron RNLAF
Training and Conversion Unit A, RNLAF
Conversie Afdeling Volkel

Norway

Norway received 18 surplus CF-104s and four CF-104Ds from Canada in 1974, the country had initially received 19 Canadair built F-104Gs and four TF-104Gs in 1963 under the Military Assistance Program. The F-104 was phased out of Norwegian service in winter 1982.
Royal Norwegian Air Force
331 Squadron based at Bodø
334 Squadron based at Bodø

Pakistan

Pakistan was the first Major non-NATO Ally to be equipped with the F-104, a total of 12 F-104A and 2 F-104B were delivered; nine F-104A (tail numbers 56-803, 56-804, 56-805, 56-807, 56-868, 56-874, 56-875, 56-877, 56-879) and two F-104B (tail numbers 57-1309, 57-1312) on 5 August 1961, although some sources say the first two were landed at Sargodha Airbase (now Mushaf Airbase) by Sqn Ldr Sadruddin and Flt Lt Middlecoat in 1962. One more F-104A was delivered on 8 June 1964 (tail number 56-773) and another on 1 March 1965 (tail number 56-798) as replacements for the lost starfighters in accidents.
Pakistani starfighters were ex-USAF Air Defence Command aircraft retro-fitted with the more powerful General Electric J-79-11A engines and, at the PAF's request, the 20 mm Vulcan gatling gun was re-installed after removal by the USAF. These F-104s had unusually high thrust to weight ratios due to the older but lighter airframe and more modern engines. The F-104 was in service for 12 years with 11,690 flight hours, 246 hours 45 minutes of these in the 1965 Indo-Pakistan War and 103 hours 45 minutes in the 1971 Indo-Pakistan War, after which five F-104 remained and were grounded by lack of spares due to post war U.S. sanctions. The type was phased out in late 1972.
Pakistan Air Force

Central Air Command
No. 38 Multi-Role Wing based at Sargodha AFB
No. 9 Squadron "Griffins"

Spain

The Spanish Air Force received their F-104s under the Military Assistance Program: 18 Canadair-built F-104Gs and three Lockheed-built TF-104Gs were delivered under MAP to Spain's Ejército del Aire in 1965. These aircraft were transferred to Greece and Turkey when they were replaced by F-4 Phantoms in 1972. It is notable that no aircraft were lost through accidents during 17,000 hours of operational use in Spain although the aircraft was used only in its intended role of an interceptor and mainly in very good flying weather.
Ejército del Aire
Ala 6 based at Torrejon (later redesignated Ala 16)
61 Escuadron (later redesignated 161 Escuadron and 104 Escuadron)

Taiwan (Republic of China)

ROC operated a total of 282 aircraft funded by the Military Assistance Program (MAP); a mixture of new-build and surplus F-104A, -B, -D, -G, -J, -DJ, RF-104G, and TF-104G were used. The Starfighter was phased out of Taiwanese service by 1997.
Republic of China Air Force
427th Tactical Fighter Wing, ROCAF based Ching Chuang Kang AB
7th Tactical Fighter Squadron, ROCAF
8th Tactical Fighter Squadron, ROCAF
28th Tactical Fighter Squadron, ROCAF
35th Tactical Fighter Squadron, ROCAF
499th Tactical Fighter Wing, ROCAF based at Hsinchu AB
41st Tactical Fighter Squadron, ROCAF
42nd Tactical Fighter Squadron, ROCAF
48th Tactical Fighter Squadron, ROCAF
401st Tactical Combined Wing, ROCAF based at Taoyuan AB
12th Tactical Reconnaissance Squadron

Turkey

Turkey received 48 new-build F-104Gs and six TF-104Gs from Lockheed and Canadair production, funded under the Military Assistance Program, which were delivered from 1963, and directly purchased 40 new F-104S interceptors from Fiat in 1974–75. In addition, like Greece, Turkey received large numbers of surplus Starfighters from several NATO nations in the 1970s and 1980s, including 170 ex-German aircraft, 53 aircraft from the Netherlands and 52 from Canada. In total, Turkey received over 400 Starfighters from various sources, although many of these aircraft were broken up for spares without having been flown. The F-104 was finally retired from Turkish service in 1995.
Turkish Air Force
4 Ana Jet Us based at Akıncı Air Base
141 Filo
142 Filo
Öncel Filo
6 Ana Jet Us based at Bandirma
161 Filo
162 Filo
8 Ana Jet Us based at Diyarbakir
181 Filo
182 Filo
9 Ana Jet Us based at Balikesir
191 Filo
192 Filo
193 Filo

United States

United States Air Force

Air Force Systems Command
U.S. Air Force Aerospace Research Pilot School (ARPS) based at Edwards AFB, California

Tactical Air Command
479th Tactical Fighter Wing based at George AFB, California
434th Tactical Fighter Squadron
435th Tactical Fighter Squadron
436th Tactical Fighter Squadron
476th Tactical Fighter Squadron

Air Defense Command / Aerospace Defense Command
56th Fighter-Interceptor Squadron based at Wright-Patterson AFB, Ohio
83d Fighter Interceptor Squadron based at Hamilton AFB, California
337th Fighter Interceptor Squadron based at Westover AFB, Massachusetts
538th Fighter-Interceptor Squadron based at Larson AFB, Washington
319th Fighter-Interceptor Squadron based at Homestead AFB, Florida
331st Fighter-Interceptor Squadron based at Webb AFB, Texas

Air National Guard
161st Fighter Interceptor Group, Arizona Air National Guard based at Goldwater ANGB/Sky Harbor International Airport, Arizona
197th Fighter Interceptor Squadron
156th Fighter Group, Puerto Rico Air National Guard based at Muñiz Air National Guard Base, Puerto Rico
198th Tactical Fighter Squadron
169th Fighter Interceptor Group, South Carolina Air National Guard based at McEntire ANGS, South Carolina
157th Fighter Interceptor Squadron
134th Fighter Interceptor Group, Tennessee Air National Guard based at McGhee Tyson ANGB, Tennessee
151st Fighter Interceptor Squadron

Civil operators

United States
NASA
Eleven F-104s (different versions) were operated by NASA between 1956 and 1994. Aircraft were used in support of the X-15 and XB-70 flight testing and were also used for astronaut training during various spaceflight programs. NASA F-104 aircraft were used to gather flight research data including aircraft handling characteristics, such as roll inertia coupling, and reaction control systems as used in the NF-104A and X-15. Space Shuttle thermal protection tiles were tested in flights aboard a Starfighter on a rig which simulated flight through rain. NASA's Starfighters flew many safety chase sorties in support of advanced research aircraft over the years, including the wingless lifting body aircraft. Neil Armstrong was one notable pilot who flew a NASA F-104.

The Starfighters F-104 Demo Team
The team based in Clearwater, Florida currently operate three Canadair CF-104 Starfighters, performing at air shows across the United States and Canada. Their CF-104s consist of a two-seat CF-104D Serial#:104632 (registered as N104RB), and two single-seat CF-104s Serial#s: 104850 (registered as N104RD) and 104759 (registered as N104RN). The aircraft were originally operated with the Royal Canadian Air Force and all later served with the Royal Norwegian Air Force before being imported into the U.S. in the early 1990s.

F-104RB "Red Baron"
Another civilian Starfighter, called the F-104RB (for Manfred von Richthofen, the "Red Baron"), was used to set the low-level speed record in October 1977 by world-famous air racer Darryl Greenamyer. Greenamyer built his F-104 over a period of 12 years from parts scrounged from various places, including a "borrowed" J79-17/1 turbojet from a McDonnell Douglas F-4 Phantom, which developed over 2,000 pounds more thrust than the standard J79-19 engine. Greenamyer attacked the record at Mud Lake, near Tonapah, Nevada, and beat the previous low-level speed record by recording a top speed of 988.26 mph (1,590.41 km/h) after five passes over the dry lake. He remained supersonic for most of the 20-minute flight, and rarely rose much higher than 100 feet above the lake bed. Several months later, while practicing for an attempt on the world absolute altitude record, he was forced to eject when his landing gear failed to extend; a belly landing in the F-104 was considered too dangerous to attempt.

Summary of production by country
 Source: F-104 Starfighter in action

See also
Canadair CF-104
CL-1200 Lancer and X-27
Lockheed NF-104A
Mutual Defense Assistance Act (Military Assistance Program)

References

Notes

Bibliography
 Bowman, Martin W. Lockheed F-104 Starfighter. Ramsbury, Marlborough, Wiltshire, UK: Crowood Press Ltd., 2000. .
 Drendel, Lou. F-104 Starfighter in action, Aircraft No. 27. Carrollton, Texas: Squadron/Signal Publications, 1976. .
 Fricker, John and Paul Jackson. "Lockheed F-104 Starfighter". Wings of Fame. Volume 2, 1996, pp. 38–99. Aerospace Publishing. London. .
 Jackson, Paul A. German Military Aviation 1956-1976. Hinckley, Leicestershire, UK: Midland Counties Publications, 1976. .
 Stachiw, Anthony L. and Andrew Tattersall. CF-104 Starfighter (Aircraft in Canadian Service). St. Catharine's, Ontario: Vanwell Publishing Limited, 2007. .

External links
A History of military equipment of Modern Greece (1821-today): Greek F-104s
 F-104 Starfighter

Lists of military units and formations by aircraft
F-104 Starfighter
Operators